Jon Mirena Bitor Castañares Larreategui (1925 – 5 May 2015) was a Spanish politician and economist. He was known for being a strong supporter of Basque nationalism. He served as mayor of Bilbao from 1979 to 1983. He died in Bilbao at the age of 90.

References

1925 births
2015 deaths
Eusko Alkartasuna Party politicians
Mayors of Bilbao
Spanish economists
Basque Nationalist Party politicians